Brackett House may refer to:

in the United States (by state then city)
 Lyman M. Brackett House, Rochester, Indiana, listed on the National Register of Historic Places (NRHP) in Fulton County
 Daniel Brackett House, Upton, Kentucky, listed on the NRHP in Hardin County
 Brackett House (Newton, Massachusetts), listed on the NRHP
 Brackett House (Reading, Massachusetts), listed on the NRHP
 S. E. Brackett House, Somerville, Massachusetts, listed on the NRHP
 Edward A. Brackett House, Winchester, Massachusetts, listed on the NRHP 
 Brackett House (Dublin, New Hampshire), listed on the NRHP in Cheshire County
 Corliss-Brackett House, Providence, Rhode Island, listed on the NRHP
 E. William Brackett House, Yakima, Washington, listed on the NRHP in Yakima County